Schoolgirl Detectives is a South Korean television series based on the novel of the same title by Park Ha-ik. Starring Jin Ji-hee, Kang Min-ah, Lee Hye-ri, Lee Min-ji, Stephanie Lee, and Kim Min-jun, it aired on jTBC from December 16, 2014 to March 17, 2015 for 14 episodes.

The series notably featured the first onscreen lesbian kiss on South Korean television. A complaint was later filed with the Korea Communications Standards Commission, but civic groups such as LGBT awareness organization Rainbow Action against Sexual Minority Discrimination criticized such deliberations even taking place.

Synopsis
Five students at the Seonam Girls' High School, Ahn Chae-yool (a classy girl, new to the school); Yoon Mi-do (the leader known as the school weirdo); Lee Yee-hee (wannabe actress/idol); Kim Ha-jae (computing expert); Choi Sung-yoon (baker and fellow peacemaker) form a detective club, and set out to solve mysteries around them, some involving bullying, abortion, and suicide.

Cast

Main
 Jin Ji-hee as Ahn Chae-yool, a super-smart transfer student who unwillingly joins the high school detective club
 Kang Min-ah as Yoon Mi-do, the leader of the detective club
 Lee Hye-ri as Lee Ye-hee, a member of the detective club who wants to become an actress
 Lee Min-ji as Kim Ha-jae, a member of the detective club who is an expert about computers
 Stephanie Lee as Choi Sung-yoon, a member of the detective club who is very tall and enjoys baking
 Kim Min-jun as Ha Yeon-joon, a wise teacher who may have a mysterious past

Supporting
People around Ahn Chae-yool
 Han Ye-joon as Ha Ra-ohn, Yeon-joon's nephew
 Lee Seung-yeon as Oh Yoo-jin, Chae-yool's mother
 Jang Ki-yong as Ahn Chae-joon, Chae-yool's older brother
 Choi Deok-moon as Ahn Hong-min, Chae-yool's father

Students
 Cho Shi-yoon as Oh Hae-ni, president of Class 1-3
 Han Ji-an as Nam Hyo-jo, school bully from Class 1-3
 Heyne as Hong Dani, theater club senior member and Ye-hee's rival
 Kyung Ji-eun as Seo Yi-na, theater club senior and Dani's friend
 Jung Yeon-joo as Park Se-yoo, a senior student who wants to find her rabbit doll
 Cheon Young-min as Jo Ah-ra, a student in trouble about her father's bakery
 Kim So-hye as Han Soo-yeon, a senior class accused of porn video and homosexuality 
 Kang Sung-ah as Park Eun-bin, Soo-yeon's girlfriend
 Han Seo-jin as Hwang Hye-ra, a senior class who commits fraud for the sake of justice.
 Lee Joo-woo as Choi Mi-rae, an ex-student who committed suicide
 Choi Joo-ri as Shim Yoon-kyung, Mi-rae's classmate

Teachers
 Hwang Seok-jeong as Lee Yeo-joo, the principal of Seonam Girls' High School
 Kim Sung-yoon as Jung Dong-soo, homeroom teacher of Class 1-3
 Kim Hye-na as Shin Jang-mi, English language teacher

Extended
 Lee Jung-hwan as Biting Man
 Lee Jae-kyun as Choi Chang-hyun, Se-yoon's ex-boyfriend
 Kim Byung-choon as Bakery owner, Ah-ra's father
 Kim Jung-kyun as Mi-do's father
 Guillaume Patry as Chae-joon's friend
 Kang Joo-hee as MC
 Hwang Shin-jung as Ra-ohn's stepmother
 Bae Young-joon as Ra-ohn's manager
 Baek Bong-ki as Kyung Jang-hyun, MU Entertainment caretaker
 Kim Young-sun as Go Mi-ja, Chang-hyun's mother
 Lee Byung-wook as Han In-soo, doctor

References

External links
  
 
 

2014 South Korean television series debuts
2015 South Korean television series endings
JTBC television dramas
South Korean LGBT-related television shows
Television shows based on South Korean novels
South Korean teen dramas
South Korean mystery television series
2010s LGBT-related comedy television series
Television series about teenagers